The 2016 Betway UK Championship was a professional ranking snooker tournament that took place from 22 November to 4 December 2016 at the Barbican Centre in York, England. It was the tenth ranking event of the 2016/2017 season.

Neil Robertson was the defending champion, but he lost 3–6 in the first round to Peter Lines.

In his last 64 match against Barry Hawkins, Fergal O'Brien made 5 centuries, setting up a new record in a best of 11 match.

Mark Allen made the 124th official maximum break in the 7th frame of his last 64 match against Rod Lawler. It was Allen's first maximum break, and it was the fifth time in a row, that a maximum was made in a UK Championship.

105 centuries were made during the tournament, breaking last year's record of 104, which included 10 from both Selby and O'Sullivan.

Mark Selby claimed his second UK title by beating Ronnie O'Sullivan 10–7 in the final.
This was Selby's 10th ranking title. This also made him the sixth player to have completed the Triple Crown twice.

Prize fund
The breakdown of prize money for this year is shown below:

 Winner: £170,000
 Runner-up: £75,000
 Semi-final: £35,000
 Quarter-final: £22,500
 Last 16: £15,000
 Last 32: £10,000
 Last 64: £5,000

 Highest break: £5,000
 Total: £850,000

The "rolling 147 prize" for a maximum break stood at £5,000.

Main draw

Top half

Section 1

Section 2

Section 3

Section 4

Bottom half

Section 5

Section 6

Section 7

Section 8

Finals

Final

Century breaks

 147, 137, 136, 136, 132, 105  Mark Allen 
 141, 126  Mark King
 140  Jimmy Robertson
 137, 134, 120, 119, 109, 107, 102, 101, 100, 100  Mark Selby
 137  Scott Donaldson
 136, 101  Joe Perry
 134, 131, 130, 130, 129, 124, 112, 106, 103, 101  Ronnie O'Sullivan
 134  Michael Georgiou
 132, 126, 106, 101  John Higgins
 131, 106  Noppon Saengkham
 130  Alan McManus
 129  Barry Hawkins
 128, 125, 118, 114, 100  Marco Fu
 128, 116, 112, 101, 101  Stephen Maguire
 127, 121, 108  Stuart Bingham
 127  Jamie Jones
 126, 118  Ryan Day
 126, 108, 102  David Gilbert
 126  Gary Wilson
 125, 110  Liam Highfield
 125, 105, 105  Zhang Anda
 123, 120  Sam Baird
 122  Wang Yuchen

 121  Mark Williams
 119, 115, 112, 110, 103  Shaun Murphy
 119  Dominic Dale
 119  Xiao Guodong
 116, 111, 100  Ali Carter
 113, 111, 111, 101, 100  Fergal O'Brien
 113  Kurt Maflin
 113  Sanderson Lam
 112  Hammad Miah
 112  Robbie Williams
 109  Judd Trump
 108  Rory McLeod
 107, 103  Mark Davis
 107, 100  Liang Wenbo
 106  Mark Joyce
 105  Igor Figueiredo
 104  Anthony McGill
 103  Robin Hull
 103  Martin Gould
 102, 102  Luca Brecel
 102  Yan Bingtao
 101  Ben Woollaston
 100  Josh Boileau

References

2016
2016 in snooker
2016 in English sport
Sport in York
UK Championship
UK Championship
2010s in York